In mathematics, differentiation of measures may refer to:

 the problem of differentiation of integrals, also known as the differentiation problem for measures;
 the Radon–Nikodym derivative of one measure with respect to another.